Actias aliena is a moth in the family Saturniidae. It is found in Japan. Its mitochondrial genome has been sequenced.

Subspecies
Actias aliena aliena (Butler, 1879)
Actias aliena sjoeqvisti Bryk, 1949

Gallery

References

Aliena
Moths described in 1879
Moths of Japan